Øksfjord Church is a parish church of the Church of Norway in Loppa Municipality in Troms og Finnmark county, Norway. It is located in the village of Øksfjord. It is main church for the Loppa parish which is part of the Alta prosti (deanery) in the Diocese of Nord-Hålogaland. The stone church was built in a long church style in 1954 using plans drawn up by the architect Hans Magnus. The church seats about 210 people.

History
The first church in Øksfjord was built in 1842. In 1898, a new church was built on the same site. This building was designed by the architect D.G. Evjen. In 1944, as the German army was retreating near the end of World War II, they burned the church to the ground. The parish built a new church on the same spot in 1954.

Media gallery

See also
List of churches in Nord-Hålogaland

References

Loppa
Churches in Finnmark
Stone churches in Norway
20th-century Church of Norway church buildings
Churches completed in 1954
1842 establishments in Norway
Long churches in Norway